Web News Observer is an online news website which was established on 12 January 2019, with its headquarters in Mysore, Karnataka, India. It covers latest news in Entertainment, Lifestyle, Korean, Technology, Sports and Business from around the world. It is owned and managed by Stacknexo LLP. The Editor-in-Chief is Musba Hashmi.

History 
Web News Observer was initially focused on covering cybersecurity and technology news. However, during the COVID-19 pandemic it started covering other news, including entertainment and lifestyle. On 20 April 2022, the news website crossed 1 million unique users monthly. On 29 April 2022, it partnered with Dailyhunt for news syndication. On 9 May 2022, the news outlet expanded its operations and acquired The Clare People, a defunct website of the Irish weekly newspaper that had ceased its operations in 2019. On 8 June 2022, the news website crossed 3 million unique users monthly.

Notable Work 
In November 2021, the news website did exclusive news stories exposing two cybersecurity scams where the scammers were impersonating Elon Musk through a verified Facebook Page and were running a cryptocurrency giveaway scam. The page was then taken down soon after when the story was covered by other media outlets. The media outlet is building India's first e-learning platform for data journalism. The platform will help train journalists and students to study and get trained in data journalism free of cost. The news organization is also known for its active engagement in social work. On 18 April 2022, it distributed books and stationery among the underprivileged children of Mysore. They also conducted an online journalism training workshop for aspiring students. On 23 May 2022, the media outlet introduced their website on Web 3.0 becoming the first news website in India to have a version of their website on Web 3.0.

See also 

 Star of Mysore
 Mysooru Mithra

References

External links 

 Official website

Mass media in Mysore
Publications established in 2019
2019 establishments in Karnataka
News websites